Annie May Hurd Karrer (July 28, 1893 in La Conner, Washington – May 15, 1984 in Orange County, Florida) was an American plant physiologist who worked for the United States Department of Agriculture.

Biography
Annie May Hurd was born in 1893 in La Conner, Washington. She received an A.B. degree from the University of Washington in 1915 and an M.S. from that institution in 1917.  She received her Ph.D. in plant physiology from the University of California, Berkeley in 1918.  The same year that she received her doctoral degree, Hurd joined the staff of the United States Department of Agriculture (USDA), as a researcher for the Bureau of Plant Industry.  She married physicist Sebastian Karrer in 1923.  She continued her work for USDA, specializing in the improvement of cereal crops and the control of their diseases.  Now as Annie Karrer, she rose to the position of associate plant physiologist in 1924; she was named plant physiologist in 1944, a position she held until 1949. Karrer published 16 papers in the USDA series of reports.  Her articles appeared in journals including the American Journal of Botany, Plant Physiology, The Journal of General Physiology, and Soil Science.  Three papers on the effects of selenium appeared in Science in the 1930s.

Karrer made a gift to the University of Washington that established the Sebastian Karrer Prize, in honor of her husband.  First given in 1947, it is awarded to a senior or graduate student in the department of physics on the basis of need, scholarship, and good character.

Selected publications

Notes

References

Bibliography
 

1893 births
1984 deaths
American women botanists
20th-century American botanists
People from La Conner, Washington
Plant physiologists
University of Washington alumni
University of California, Berkeley alumni
United States Department of Agriculture people
20th-century American women scientists